Alfred Tweedy (born February 24, 1880) was a member of the Connecticut Senate from the 26th District.

Biography
Tweedy was born on February 24, 1880, in Milwaukee, Wisconsin. He would become a lawyer.

Political career
Tweedy was a member of the Senate in 1945. Previously, he was a probate court judge. He was a Republican.

References

1880 births
Connecticut lawyers
Republican Party Connecticut state senators
Connecticut state court judges
People from Darien, Connecticut
Politicians from Milwaukee
Probate court judges in the United States
Year of death missing
Lawyers from Milwaukee